The men's long jump event at the 2002 Asian Athletics Championships was held in Colombo, Sri Lanka on 10–12 August.

Medalists

Results

Qualification

Final

References

2002 Asian Athletics Championships
Long jump at the Asian Athletics Championships